The Wildseeloder is a  mountain in the eastern Kitzbühel Alps in Tyrol, Austria. The valley base for the Wildseeloder is Fieberbrunn in the Pillersee valley. On its northern slopes is a ski area. The summit, which has no lifts up to it, is a popular ski touring destination in winter. West of the Wildseeloder is a lake, the Wildsee, in a cirque hollow. The Wildseeloderhaus stands on its shore. The easiest ascent to the Wildseeloder runs from Fieberbrunn to the north, over the Lärchfilzkogel past the Wildseeloderhaus.

Gallery 

Mountains of the Alps
Mountains of Tyrol (state)
Two-thousanders of Austria
Kitzbühel Alps